Dong Wenhua (born June 29, 1962) is a Chinese singer of the People's Liberation Army.  "Moon of the Fifteenth", "Story of Spring", as well as many other songs of hers were popular to the youth generation of the 1980s and the early 1990s. In America, she has performed at both Lincoln Center and Carnegie Hall.

References 

1962 births
Living people
Chinese women singers
Singers from Liaoning
Musicians from Shenyang
Academic staff of the East China Normal University
Educators from Liaoning
People's Republic of China politicians from Liaoning
Politicians from Shenyang